

The Fokker M 10 was a two-seater reconnaissance / fighter-trainer biplane with single-bay wings equipped with wing-warping controls for roll, powered by a 7-cylinder 80 hp Oberursel U.0 engine. Several M 10 aircraft were purchased by the Imperial and Royal Aviation Troops of Austro Hungary.

During the First World War the Imperial and Royal Aviation Troops (colloquially known as the Austro-Hungarian Air Service or K.u.K. Luftfahrtruppen) lacked aircraft production capacity, purchasing aircraft from its German ally. In 1916 the Fokker M 10 was acquired in two versions, with single-bay wings as the Fokker M 10E (E for Einstielig), known to the Luftfahrtruppen as the Fokker B.I), and the Fokker M 10Z (Z for Zweistielig), with two-bay wings (known by the Luftfahrtruppen as the Fokker B.II).

The single-bay winged M 10E (B.I) was powered by an  Oberursel U.0 7-cyl. rotary engine and was derived directly from the earlier Fokker M 7, which had been operated by the Naval air service of the Kaiserliche Marine from 1915. The aircraft were almost identical with the exception of revised and strengthened undercarriage and centre section cabane struts.

The first machine, 03.61, was delivered in April 1916. Due to the lack of engines the next 19 aircraft arrived in August 1916 and the last three in September 1916. All aircraft served as unarmed trainers assigned to Flek 4, Flek 6 and Flek 8 until the end of the war The only exception was the first delivered machine the 03.61, which served as a test bed for variety of armament installation.

Operators

KuKLFT

Luftstreitkrafte
Kaiserliche Marine

Specifications (M.10Z)

See also

Notes

References

 *

1910s German military reconnaissance aircraft
M.10)
Biplanes
Single-engined tractor aircraft
Rotary-engined aircraft
Aircraft first flown in 1915